Sophronisca is a genus of longhorn beetles of the subfamily Lamiinae, containing the following species:

 Sophronisca angolense Lepesme, 1953
 Sophronisca annulicornis Breuning, 1942
 Sophronisca brunnea Aurivillius, 1927
 Sophronisca duprixi Lepesme & Breuning, 1955
 Sophronisca elongata Breuning, 1943
 Sophronisca grisea Aurivillius, 1910
 Sophronisca longula Breuning, 1964
 Sophronisca murina Breuning, 1954
 Sophronisca nigra Lepesme & Breuning, 1952
 Sophronisca nigrescens Breuning, 1947
 Sophronisca obscura Breuning, 1942
 Sophronisca ruficeps Breuning, 1954
 Sophronisca rufotarsalis Breuning, 1972
 Sophronisca rufula Breuning, 1954

References

Desmiphorini